The 2022 EFL Trophy Final (known for sponsorship reasons as the 2022 Papa Johns Trophy) was a football match played at Wembley Stadium, London, on 3 April 2022. It decided the winners of the 2021–22 EFL Trophy, the 38th edition of the competition, a knock-out tournament for the 48 teams in League One and League Two and 16 category one academy sides. Rotherham United beat Sutton United 4–2 after extra time. Sutton led 2–1 going into injury time at the end of the second half before Jordi Osei-Tutu scored a 96th-minute equaliser; Chiedozie Ogbene and Michael Ihiekwe then scored in extra time to give Rotherham their second EFL Trophy title.

Route to the final

Rotherham United

Sutton United

Match

References

2022
Events at Wembley Stadium
2022 Trophy Final
Efl Trophy Final
Efl Trophy Final 2022
Football League Trophy Final 2022
Efl Trophy Final 2022